This is a list in alphabetical order of cricketers who have played for Sri Lanka Army Sports Club (SLASC) in first-class matches since the club initially achieved first-class status in 2007. Where there is an article, the link comes before the club career span, and the scorecard name (typically initials and surname) comes after. If no article is present, the scorecard name comes before the span.

B
 B. A. D. Balasooriya (2006–07 to 2009–10)
 Danusika Bandara (2008–09 to 2018–19) : G. D. Bandara
 H. M. P. I. Bandara (2006–07)
 K. B. A. K. Basnayake (2020–21)
 P. B. S. Botheju (2022 to 2022–23)

C
 Iresh Chamara (2019–20) : D. D. A. I. Chamara
 Dinesh Chandimal (2019–20 to 2022–23) : L. D. Chandimal
 K. G. B. Chandrabose (2021–22 to 2022)
 S. S. Coomaraswamy (2018–19 to 2020)

D
 P. D. C. Damith (2012–13 to 2017–18)
 Kasun de Silva (2016–17 to 2018–19) : A. K. N. de Silva
 A. S. D. de Silva (2020–21 to 2021–22)
 Yohan de Silva (2015–16) : A. Y. R. de Silva
 E. P. N. de Silva (2006–07)
 Hansa de Silva (2019–20) : H. P. de Silva
 Shihan de Silva (2019–20 to 2020) : N. S. H. de Silva
 W. S. M. de Silva (2014–15)
 Dilshan de Soysa (2016–17 to 2018–19) : D. D. de Soysa
 D. de Zoysa (2014–15)
 Manjula de Zoysa (2006–07 to 2016–17) : H. H. M. de Zoysa
 Tharindu Dharsana (2017–18) : H. T. Dharsana
 S. Dilrange (2014–15)
 Pathum Dilshan (2015–16 to 2022) : M. V. T. P. Dilshan
 Sasika Dilshan (2020–21) : W. A. S. Dilshan
 Thulina Dilshan (2018–19 to 2022–23) : W. T. Dilshan

E
 Lakshan Edirisinghe (2012–13 to 2022–23) : L. E. K. Edirisinghe
 P. M. D. Edirisinghe (2017–18)

F
 K. W. S. L. Fernando (2020–21 to 2022–23)
 M. N. S. Fernando (2016–17)
 V. C. C. Fernando (2010–11 to 2012–13)
 W. S. E. N. Fernando (2022 to 2022–23)
 Suresh Fernando (2009–10 to 2010–11) : W. W. S. T. Fernando
 M. Feshal (2010–11 to 2014–15)
 L. Francisco (2014–15)
 Leo Fransisco (2013–14 to 2017–18) : L. K. Fransisco

G
 K. L. Gamage (2022)
 Asela Gunaratne (2008–09 to 2022–23) : D. A. S. Gunaratne

H
 Heshan Hettiarchchi (2019–20 to 2022) : H. N. Hettiarachchi

I
 Navod Ilukwatta (2016–17 to 2017–18) : N. K. Ilukwatta
 Damith Indika (2009–10) : G. D. D. Indika
 Iran Indika (2014–15 to 2015–16) : K. I. Indika

J
 J. A. S. Jayasinghe (2014–15)
 Roshan Jayatissa (2009–10 to 2014–15) : D. K. R. C. Jayatissa
 Sulan Jayawardene (2008–09 to 2015–16) : S. L. Jayawardene
 Chinthaka Jayawickrama (2006–07) : Y. C. B. Jayawickrama

K
 K. R. M. D. Kaluarachchi (2012–13)
 P. N. Kaluarachchi (2007–08 to 2009–10)
 Shalika Karunanayake (2013–14 to 2015–16) : K. P. S. P. Karunanayake
 R. D. I. A. Karunatilleke (2006–07 to 2012–13)
 P. H. T. Kaushal (2020–21 to 2021–22)
 H. H. R. Kavinga (2010–11 to 2013–14)
 Gihan Koralage (2019–20 to 2022–23) : M. K. G. N. Koralage
 Kavindu Kularathne (2019–20) : P. D. K. H. Kularathne
 T. D. Kumar (2006–07)
 L. C. Kumara (2006–07)
 Mahesh Kumara (2019–20 to 2022–23) : L. P. P. M. Kumara
 N. K. D. M. Kumara (2010–11)
 Thuduwage Kumara (2 to ) : T. P. Kumara (2015–16)
 Kaweesh Kumara (2018–19) : W. K. D. P. Kumara

L
 K. Lakshan (2014–15)
 D. A. Lawrance (2006–07 to 2008–09)
 Himasha Liyanage (2016–17 to 2022–23) : H. S. Liyanage
 Nuwan Liyanapathirana (2007–08 to 2018–19) : N. K. Liyanapathirana

M
 L. Madusanka (2014–15)
 Malka Madusanka (2017–18 to 2020) : W. M. Madusanka
 Lakshitha Madushan (2012–13 to 2018–19) : A. V. L. Madushan
 S. Madushan (2014–15)
 W. S. Madushan (2014–15)
 Buddika Madushanka (2017–18 to 2018–19) : A. B. Madushanka
 Lakshan Madushanka (2013–14 to 2018–19) : L. L. Madushanka
 K. D. A. Manoj (2022 to 2022–23)
 T. S. Masmulla (2009–10)
 Ajantha Mendis (2006–07 to 2017–18) : B. A. W. Mendis
 C. Mendis (2014–15)
 K. Y. N. Mendis (2014–15 to 2022–23)
 T. R. D. Mendis (2006–07 to 2009–10)

N
 K. Nanayakkara (2022 to 2022–23)

P
 Ravindra Palleguruge (2006–07 to 2015–16) : W. R. Palleguruge
 R. Palliyaguruge (2014–15)
 D. P. S. D. Peiris (2006–07)
 P. P. M. Peiris (2007–08 to 2009–10)
 N. L. T. C. Perera (2019–20 to 2022–23)
 K. C. Prasad (2006–07 to 2011–12)
 Seekkuge Prasanna (2006–07 to 2022–23) : S. Prasanna
 Nalin Priyadarshana (2016–17) : R. P. N. Priyadarshana
 R. Punchihewa (2021–22)
 Viraj Pushpakumara (2016–17 to 2018–19) : G. V. Pushpakumara

R
 Agith Rajapaksha (2018–19) : R. M. A. S. Rajapaksha
 Ashan Randika (2016–17 to 2022–23) : D. A. Randika
 Priyantha Rathnayake (2020–21) : M. K. G. P. P. Rathnayake
 N. Rathnayake (2014–15)
 Navantha Rathnayake (2006–07 to 2017–18) : P. K. N. M. K. Rathnayake
 Sanjika Ridma (2014–15 to 2018–19) : S. Ridma

S
 D. R. Samarasinghe (2006–07)
 Janaka Sampath (2009–10 to 2019–20) : J. Sampath
 W. H. P. Sandeepa (2022–23)
 S. Sanjeewa (2006–07 to 2012–13)
 G. C. P. Senadeera (2010–11)
 K. L. M. S. Senaviwickrama (2022)
 T. C. Sendanayake (2008–09 to 2009–10)
 Janith Silva (2010–11 to 2020–21) : A. J. C. Silva
 G. W. R. T. Silva (2017–18 to 2018–19)
 Chathuranga Silva (2020) : K. H. C. Silva)
 K. T. N. M. Silva (2011–12 to 2013–14)
 L. C. E. Silva (2008–09 to 2010–11)
 Ranjan Silva (2009–10 to 2017–18) : P. J. H. S. R. Silva
 D. R. P. S. Siriwardhana (2022)
 T. D. T. Soysa (2006–07 to 2014–15)
 L. M. R. Suresh (2006–07 to 2007–08)

T
 W. W. P. Taraka (2009–10)
 D. L. U. Thabrew (2013–14)
 M. M. Theekshana (2020–21 to 2022)
 T. M. C. B. Thelwadana (2006–07)
 R. Thenurathan (2022)
 Adeesha Thilanchana (2014–15 to 2015–16) : A. Thilanchana
 R. S. Tillakaratne (2020–21)

U
 Krishantha Ukwatte (2008–09) : U. K. Ukwatte*

V
 D. D. Vijithakumara (2011–12)
 Dushan Vimukthi (2015–16 to 2020–21) : D. Vimukthi

W
 Vishvashantha Weerakoon (2007–08 to 2009–10) : W. M. V. Weerakoon
 Lahiru Wijetunga (2019–20) : B. L. I. Wijetunga
 A. D. L. Wijewardene (2006–07 to 2008–09)
 Chanaka Withanage (2009–10) : C. M. Withanage

Z
 W. H. S. N. Zoysa (2021–22 to 2022–23)

References

Sri Lanka Army Sports Club